Shahaniza binti Shamsuddin is a Malaysian politician and had served as Pahang State Executive Councillor until November 2022.

Election Results

Honours
  :
  Knight Companion of the Order of the Crown of Pahang (DIMP) – Dato' (2006)
  Grand Knight of the Order of Sultan Ahmad Shah of Pahang (SSAP) – Dato' Sri (2017)

References

Living people
People from Pahang
Malaysian people of Malay descent
Malaysian Muslims
United Malays National Organisation politicians
Members of the Pahang State Legislative Assembly
Pahang state executive councillors
21st-century Malaysian politicians
1970 births